Lydia Sklevicky (7 May 1952 – 21 January 1990) was a Croatian feminist theorist, historian and sociologist. "The first Croatian scholar to address the social history of women from a feminist perspective, Sklevicky’s contribution to the disciplines of history, sociology and anthropology was unique—in many respects unrivalled today—as was her contribution to feminism."

Life
Lydia Sklevicky was born in Zagreb, Yugoslavia (now Croatia) on 7 May 1952. She graduated from the University of Zagreb in 1976 with a double major of sociology and ethnology and subsequently worked for the Institute for the History of the Workers’ Movement in Croatia. She gave birth to a daughter in 1978. Sklevicky received her M.A. from Zagreb in the sociology of culture in 1984. She was killed in an automobile accident in Delnice, Croatia, on 21 January 1990.

Activities
Sklevicky coordinated the first feminist meetings in Zagreb in the late 1970s and was one of the founders of the group Women and Society in 1979. She served as the group's coordinator in 1982–83 and later volunteered for the Zagreb-based SOS Hotline for abused women and children. With Žarana Papić, she co-edited the first book of feminist anthropology in Yugoslavia in 1983, entitled Towards an Anthropology of Woman (Antropologija žene). In the late 1980s she was a columnist for the women's magazine World, addressing "numerous topics including abortion, the female body, witches and ‘respectable’ feminists". A posthumous collection of her work, including her unfinished Ph.D. dissertation, Emancipation and Organization: The Antifascist Women’s Front and Post-revolutionary Social Change. (People’s Republic of Croatia 1945–1953)), was published in 1996 in Horses, Women, Wars.

Notes

References

1952 births
1990 deaths
Croatian feminists
Feminist theorists
Road incident deaths in Croatia
Croatian people of Russian descent